

Paul Scharfe (6 September 1876 – 29 July 1942) was a high-ranking commander in the SS of Nazi Germany and first head of the SS Court Main Office.  

Scharfe, son of a headmaster, was an officer in the German Army since 1897.  He was a comrade of Paul Hausser. After marrying in 1903, Scharfe served in the Reserve of the police.  In World War I, he fought briefly on the Polish front during 1914-15.  From 1921 to 1931, he made a career in the Prussian police.

On 1 October 1931, he joined the Nazi Party (member no. 665,697) and the SS (member no. 14,220).  On 20 April 1942, he was promoted to SS-Obergruppenführer.  On 1 July 1939, he was appointed the first director of the newly formed SS Court Main Office in Munich, the legal department of the SS in Nazi Germany. It was responsible for formulating the laws and codes for the SS and various other groups of the police, conducting its own investigations and trials, as well as administering the SS and Police Courts and penal systems. This legal status meant all SS personnel were only accountable to the SS court. This effectively placed the SS above German law.

Paul Scharfe died of natural causes in July 1942.  His successor, from 15 August 1942, was Franz Breithaupt.

See also
List SS-Obergruppenführer

References
 Ailsby, Christopher (1997). SS:  Roll Of Infamy. Motorbooks International. p. 149. 
 Klee, Ernst (2007). Das Personenlexikon zum Dritten Reich: Wer war was vor und nach 1945. Fischer-Taschenbuch-Verlag, Frankfurt am Main. 
 Höhne, Heinz (1998). Der Orden unter dem Totenkopf - Die Geschichte der SS. Weltbild-Verlag, Augsburg. .
 

1876 births
1942 deaths
SS-Obergruppenführer
Waffen-SS personnel
German police officers